Marino Alberto Penna Miranda (18 January 1929 – 4 January 2023) was a Chilean chemical engineer and politician. A member of the Christian Democratic Party, he served in the Chamber of Deputies from 1965 to 1973.

Penna died on 4 January 2023, at the age of 93.

References

1929 births
2023 deaths
Christian Democratic Party (Chile) politicians
Members of the Chamber of Deputies of Chile
Deputies of the XLV Legislative Period of the National Congress of Chile
Deputies of the XLVI Legislative Period of the National Congress of Chile
Federico Santa María Technical University alumni
People from Ovalle